General elections were held in the Netherlands on 3 May 1994. The Labour Party emerged as the largest party, winning 37 of the 150 seats in the House of Representatives. The election resulted in significant losses for both the Labour Party and the Christian Democratic Appeal. The two liberal parties, People's Party for Freedom and Democracy and Democrats 66 made large gains, whilst two pro-elderly parties and the Socialist Party all passed the electoral threshold to win seats.

The Centre Democrats of Hans Janmaat won 3 seats.

The formation of a government coalition was arduous but after four months the First Kok cabinet was formed.

It was an unprecedented coalition of the two liberal parties and Labour. The CDA was consigned to opposition for the first time in its history. It was also the first government since 1918 not to include a Christian Democratic party.

Background
Before the 1994 general election opinion polls predicted that the Centre Democrats party could win more than five seats in the House of Representatives. However, media reports claiming that some newly elected local members had extremist pasts damaged the Centre Democrats' prospects. A secret recording broadcast on national television one week before the election showed an Amsterdam council member bragging about having set immigrant centers on fire in the early 1980s. In the election that followed, the Centre Democrats won 2.5% of the vote and three seats in the House of Representatives (Janmaat was joined by Wil Schuurman and Cor Zonneveld), well below earlier expectations. Janmaat claimed that the relatively poor result was a result of an anti-CD campaign in the media. Due to its growth, and questions arising amongst the other parties over the development of a multicultural society,  political opponents began to confront the Centre Democrats directly rather than maintain a strict cordon sanitaire around it.

Results

By province

References

Further reading
Irwin, Galen A. "The Dutch Parliamentary Election of 1994," Electoral Studies (1995) 14#1 pp. 72–77

General elections in the Netherlands
Netherlands
General
Netherlands